is a railway station on the Kagoshima Main Line that opened in 1914 and is operated by Kyushu Railway Company in Satsumasendai, Kagoshima, Japan

Lines 
Kyushu Railway Company
Kagoshima Main Line

JR

Adjacent stations

References

Railway stations in Kagoshima Prefecture
Railway stations in Japan opened in 1914